Fairfield is a city in and the county seat of Solano County, California, in the North Bay sub-region of the San Francisco Bay Area. Fairfield was founded in 1856 by clippership captain Robert H. Waterman, and named after his former hometown of Fairfield, Connecticut.

It is the home of Travis Air Force Base and the headquarters of Jelly Belly.  With a population of 119,881 at the 2020 census, it is slightly smaller in population than Vallejo. Other nearby cities include Suisun City, Vacaville, Rio Vista, Benicia, and Napa.

History

According to the City of Fairfield website, Native Americans, such as those from the Ion culture, settled in the Rockville and Green Valley areas. Artifacts that have been found from some of the earliest human inhabitants of the Fairfield area are dated to be around five to six thousand years old, making them some of the oldest Native American settlements in Northern California. 
 
The first European contact came in 1810 when the Spanish army was ordered to attack the Suisun Indians. In 1835, the Mexican General Vallejo was so magnanimous in victory over the Indian Chief Sem Yeto that the chief later became his ally in conflicts against other tribes. In 1837, the Indian Chief Solano received the Rancho Suisun Mexican land grant. This grant eventually came into the hands of a clipper ship captain from Fairfield, Connecticut named Robert H. Waterman. He not only parceled out the town in 1856, but also entered Fairfield in the race for Solano County seat in 1858, and won it from Benicia. As an inducement, he granted  of land for the construction of county buildings. In 1903, Fairfield was incorporated as a city.

In 1967, City Manager B. Gale Wilson directed the City to construct a new Civic Center, which was completed in 1971.

Geography

The total area is 5.65% water.

The city is located within the California Coastal Ranges. The city is centered directly north of the Suisun Bay and northeast of the San Pablo Bay. Much of the Suisun Bay contains the Suisun Marsh, the largest saltwater marsh on the west coast of the United States.

The city includes one hospital, NorthBay Medical Center, a 154-bed advanced medical facility that also features a level II Trauma Center.

Climate 
Fairfield has a hot-summer Mediterranean climate (Köppen Csa). Summers have hot afternoons with cool nights with a lengthy dry period, whereas winters see frequent rainfall with mild to cool temperatures.

Demographics

2020 
According to the 2020 United States Census, Fairfield had a population of 119,881. During the period between 2017-2021, on average, 3.16 people lived in a household. The racial makeup of Fairfield is 42.2% White, 15.9% Black or African American, 0.6% Native American, 17.7% Asian, 1.2% Native Hawaiian or Pacific Islander, and 12.9% from two or more races. Hispanic or Latino of any race was 29.3%. Non-Hispanic White was 29.0%.

Approximately one-quarter of Fairfield's population is under the age of 18 (25.3%). People who were 65 years or older constituted 13.0% of the population.

2010
The 2010 United States Census reported that Fairfield had a population of 105,322. The racial makeup of Fairfield was 48,407 (46.0%) White, 16,586 (15.7%) African American, 869 (0.8%) Native American, 15,700 (14.9%) Asian (9.1% Filipino, 1.8% Indian, 1.0% Chinese, 0.6% Vietnamese, 0.6% Japanese, 0.4% Korean, 0.3% Laotian, 0.2% Thai, 0.1% Pakistani), 1,149 (1.1%) Pacific Islander, 13,301 (12.6%) from other races, and 9,309 (8.8%) from two or more races. Hispanic or Latino of any race were 28,789 persons (27.3%); 21.2% of Fairfield was Mexican, 1.1% Puerto Rican, 1.0% Salvadoran, 0.5% Nicaraguan, 0.3% Guatemalan, 0.2% Cuban, and 0.2% Peruvian.

The Census reported that 102,832 people (97.6% of the population) lived in households, 1,221 (1.2%) lived in non-institutionalized group quarters, and 1,268 (1.2%) were institutionalized.

There were 34,484 households, out of which 14,725 (42.7%) had children under the age of 18 living in them, 18,461 (53.5%) were opposite-sex married couples living together, 5,203 (15.1%) had a female householder with no husband present, 2,179 (6.3%) had a male householder with no wife present.  There were 2,052 (6.0%) unmarried opposite-sex partnerships, and 237 (0.7%) same-sex married couples or partnerships. 6,802 households (19.7%) were made up of individuals, and 2,500 (7.2%) had someone living alone who was 65 years of age or older. The average household size was 2.98.  There were 25,843 families (74.9% of all households); the average family size was 3.42.

The population was spread out, with 28,499 people (27.1%) under the age of 18, 11,246 people (10.7%) aged 18 to 24, 28,917 people (27.5%) aged 25 to 44, 25,884 people (24.6%) aged 45 to 64, and 10,775 people (10.2%) who were 65 years of age or older.  The median age was 33.7 years. For every 100 females, there were 97.0 males.  For every 100 females age 18 and over, there were 94.6 males.

The homeowner vacancy rate was 2.5%; the rental vacancy rate was 7.1%.  61,652 people (58.5% of the population) lived in owner-occupied housing units and 41,180 people (39.1%) lived in rental housing units.

2000
As of the census of 2000, there were 96,178 people, 30,870 households, and 24,016 families residing in the city.  The population density was 986.3/km2 (2,554.2/mi2).  There were 31,792 housing units at an average density of 326.0/km2 (844.3/mi2).  The racial makeup of the city was 56.21% White, 15.02% Black or African American, 0.77% Native American, 10.89% Asian, 0.93% Pacific Islander, 8.77% from other races, and 7.41% from two or more races.  18.77% of the population were Hispanic or Latino of any race.

There were 30,870 households, out of which 43.1% had children under the age of 18 living with them, 58.4% were married couples living together, 14.2% had a female householder with no husband present, and 22.2% were non-families. 17.0% of all households were made up of individuals, and 5.5% had someone living alone who was 65 years of age or older.  The average household size was 2.98 and the average family size was 3.33.

In the city, the population was spread out, with 29.8% under the age of 18, 11.1% from 18 to 24, 31.3% from 25 to 44, 18.8% from 45 to 64, and 9.0% who were 65 years of age or older.  The median age was 31 years.  For every 100 females, there were 99.1 males.  For every 100 females age 18 and over, there were 97.4 males.

The median income for a household in the city was $51,151, and the median income for a family was $55,503. Males had a median income of $38,544 versus $30,616 for females. The per capita income for the city was $20,617.  9.3% of the population and 7.1% of families were below the poverty line.  Out of the total population, 12.1% of those under the age of 18 and 5.2% of those 65 and older were living below the poverty line.

Industry and major employers
Fairfield has a diversified economy, with government, manufacturing, healthcare, retail, professional and commercial construction sectors. Anheuser-Busch operates a large regional Budweiser brewery, Clorox produces bleach products, and the Jelly Belly Candy Company confects its jelly beans in Fairfield. Partnership HealthPlan of California, an insurer, is based in Fairfield.

Top employers

According to the City's 2021-2022 Popular Annual Financial Report, the top employers in the city are:

Government

Prior to 2020, there were five city councilmembers, which include the Vice-Mayor and Mayor. Councilmembers are elected at large for four-year, staggered terms. Elections are held in November of even-numbered years. Beginning in November 2020, city council elections in Fairfield were conducted by district, with six district seats and an at-large mayoral seat for a total of seven council seats.

As of September 2022, there were 63,897 registered voters in Fairfield; of these, 32,104 (50.2%) are Democrats, 12,810 (20.0%) are Republicans, and 14,808 (23.2%) stated no party preference.

Schools

Fairfield is served by two school districts: the Fairfield-Suisun Unified School District and Travis Unified School District. The city is also served by a community college district, private schools, and colleges.

Fairfield-Suisun Unified School District 
The Fairfield-Suisun Unified School District (FSUSD) includes the following campuses:
Area high schools
Angelo Rodriguez High School (Early College program)
Armijo High School (International Baccalaureate program)
Fairfield High School
 Sem Yeto High School (at Fairfield High School)
 Sem Yeto Satellite (at Armijo High School)

Area middle schools
B. Gale Wilson Middle School
Crystal Middle School
Grange Middle School
Golden West Middle School
Green Valley Middle School
Matt Garcia Career & College Academy

Area elementary schools
 Anna Kyle Elementary School
 Cleo Gordon Elementary School
 Cordelia Hills Elementary School
 David Weir K-8 Preparatory Academy
 Dover Academy for International Studies (K-8) (opening 2016–2017 school year)
 Sheldon Academy of Innovative Learning (K-8) (1:1 Technology focus)
 Fairview Elementary School
 K. I. Jones Elementary School (GATE Magnet Site)
 Laurel Creek Elementary School
 Nelda Mundy Elementary School
 Oakbrook Academy of the Arts (Visual & Performing Arts focus)
 Rolling Hills Elementary School
 Suisun Valley K-8 School
 Tolenas Elementary School
Area alternative schools and other programs
 Fairfield-Suisun Adult School (Bransford location)
 H. Glenn Richardson Education Complex (DELTA and SIGMA Programs operated by SCOE)
 Mary Bird Early Education Center
 Public Safety Academy (Amy Blanc location; Grades 5-12)
 State Preschool Programs (Anna Kyle, Bransford, Fairview locations)
 Sullivan Language Immersion Academy
 Virtual Academy of Fairfield-Suisun

Travis Unified School District 
The Travis Unified School District (TUSD), which serves Travis Air Force Base (TAFB) and parts of Fairfield and Vacaville, includes the following campuses:

 Center Elementary School
 Scandia Elementary School
 Travis Elementary School
 Golden West Middle School
 Travis Education Center (Grades 9-12)
 Vanden High School

Solano County Office of Education 
The Solano County Office of Education (SCOE) offers the following programs:

 Evergreen Academy
 Golden Hills Community School
 SCOE Distance Learning Program

Private schools 
Private institutions with campuses in Fairfield include:

 Holy Spirit School (Catholic Private School K-8)

Colleges and universities 
The main Solano Community College campus is located just outside of Fairfield City limits.

Other colleges and universities nearby include:

 California Maritime Academy (CSU)
 UC Berkeley
 UC Davis
 Sacramento State
 CSU East Bay
 Sonoma State
 St. Mary's College
 Touro University California
 InterCoast College (Fairfield campus)
 UMASS Global (Fairfield campus)
 Embry Riddle Aeronautical University (at Travis AFB)

Arts and culture 
Downtown Fairfield offers shopping, community festivals, and entertainment.

The city's libraries are operated by Solano County Library. The Fairfield Civic Center Library is located north of downtown along Civic Center Drive. The Fairfield Cordelia Library, which is located along Business Center Drive, services the Green Valley and Cordelia neighborhoods. A third library is currently planned to be located within northeast Fairfield.

The City holds an annual Tomato and Vine Festival, which is held in downtown Fairfield. Other special events include celebrations for 4th of July and Día de los Muertos.

The City Council appoints a Poet Laureate every two years. The Poet Laureate's role is to advocate for poetry and the advancement of literary arts in the community.

Recreation

Regional and community parks 
Rockville Hills Regional Park

The Park is located on Rockville Road approximately 3/4 of a mile from the corner of Suisun Valley Road and Rockville Road. The park allows bicycling, hiking, and provides walking trails.

Linear Park Trail

The Linear Park Trail stretches through the city along a former railroad right-of-way, beginning at Solano College and terminating near Lake Trail. Picnic tables and play equipment can be found along the route. The park provides active transportation for pedestrians, cyclists, and other micromobility users (e.g. scooters).

In 2017, the City of Fairfield adopted the Central Fairfield Revitalization and Linear Park Concept Plan, which covers the area between the Rose Garden south of Travis Boulevard to the crossing at Dover Avenue. The Plan seeks to improve safety and circulation within the Trail and in surrounding neighborhoods while also enhancing wayfinding, amenities, and landscaping.

Allan Witt Community Park

Allan Witt Park is located along West Texas Street and Woolner Avenue within the Heart of Fairfield. The park serves as a major recreation facility for the city, including an Aquatics Complex, the Fairfield Sports Center, and the Fairfield-Suisun Rotary Skate Park. The new Aquatics Complex includes water slides, toddler play area, youth play pool, lap swimming, indoor activity pool, and a "lazy river" current for water walking or floating. The park also offers tennis courts, a recreation building, picnic area, ball fields, basketball courts, volleyball courts, a skate park, and horse shoe pits. Restroom facilities are available.

In 2018, the City of Fairfield adopted the Allan Witt Community Park Renovation Plan. The Plan seeks to improve safety, security, and circulation within the park while also enhancing the park's existing amenities and programming. Phase 1 and Phase 2 of the plan are already completed, which renovated the existing skate park and added a new dog park. Phase 3 of the plan will construct a new, all-inclusive play area for users of all abilities. Phase 4 will construct two new fenced softball fields. The remaining phases include a new community gathering area, an artificial sports field, sport courts, and new little league fields.

Cordelia Community Park 
Cordelia Community Park is located along Gold Hill Road within the Cordelia neighborhood. Similar to other community parks in the city, the park serves as the Cordelia area's main recreation facility. Amenities include a dog park, fitness stations, picnic areas, Little League fields, a playground, tennis and volleyball courts, a skate park, and fields. Restroom facilities are available.

Laurel Creek Community Park 
Laurel Creek Community Park is located along Cement Hill Road within central Fairfield. Like other community parks, Laurel Creek is the surrounding area's main recreation facility. Amenities include ballfields, fitness stations, picnic areas, a playground, soccer fields, and a neighborhood center. Restroom facilities are available.

Matt Garcia Community Park 
Matt Garcia Community Park is a planned, new 50-acre park to be located along Vanden Road in northeast Fairfield.

The City is working with Gates + Associates to develop a master plan for the park, a draft of which is expected for release in Spring 2023.

Neighborhood parks 
The city also has a number of neighborhood parks, as listed below:

 Civic Center Park
 Dover Neighborhood Park
 Dunnell Nature Park & Education Center
 Gary Falati Neighborhood Park
 Hayes & Utah Street Tot Lot
 Kentucky Street Tot Lot
 Lee Bell Neighborhood Park
 Linear Park Playground at 2nd Street
 Linear Park Playground at 5th Street
 Mankas Neighborhood Park
 Meadow Glen Neighborhood Park
 Meadow Neighborhood Park
 Octo Inn Soccer Complex
 Ridgeview Neighborhood Park
 Rolling Hills Neighborhood Park
 Sunrise Neighborhood Park
 Tabor Neighborhood Park
 Tolenas Neighborhood Park
 Veterans Memorial Park
 Vintage Green Valley Neighborhood Park
 Woodcreek Neighborhood Park

Golf courses 
Fairfield is home to three golf courses, two public and one private (located in unincorporated area east of Fairfield, north of TAFB for use by military personnel). Paradise Valley and Rancho Solano Golf Courses, both public, are rated in the Zagat Survey of "America's Best Golf Courses," rated  stars by Golf Digest Magazine in 2010 and voted #1 and #2 golf courses in Solano County for consecutive years.

Transportation
Interstate 80 passes through Fairfield, connecting San Francisco to the southwest and Sacramento to the northeast. Interstate 680 begins its journey south through the eastern cities of the Bay Area to San Jose. State Route 12 connects Fairfield with Napa to the west, and Rio Vista to the east.

The Fairfield-Vacaville Hannigan railroad station located east of Peabody Road serves the communities of Fairfield, Suisun City, and Vacaville. The station opened in November 2017. The station is served by Capitol Corridor trains operated by Amtrak California. Additionally, the Suisun-Fairfield station, located adjacent to downtown Fairfield in neighboring Suisun City, serves the central Solano area. Greyhound utilizes this station for service to the Fairfield-Suisun area as well.

The Fairfield Transportation Center, located along West Texas Street and adjacent to Interstate 80, is the main hub for commuters via bus as well as vanpools and park-and-ride to the Sacramento area and the San Francisco Bay Area. Fairfield and Suisun Transit (FAST) provides local bus service. SolanoExpress, which is operated by SolTrans, provides intercity connections to Vacaville, Vallejo, Davis, El Cerrito del Norte BART, Walnut Creek BART, and Sacramento. The VINE and Rio Vista Delta Breeze also provide connections to Napa and Rio Vista respectively.

Sister city relations
 - Nirasaki, Yamanashi, Japan

Notable people

 Sasha Banks, professional wrestler for WWE
 Brad Bergesen, starting pitcher for the MLB Baltimore Orioles
 Desmond Bishop, Super Bowl Champion former starting middle linebacker for the NFL Green Bay Packers, Graduated from Fairfield High School class of 2002
 Deone Bucannon, starting safety for the NFL Arizona Cardinals, Graduated from Vanden High School class of 2010
 Cat Cora starred in the television hit series Iron Chef America
 Chris Daly, former San Francisco supervisor
 Jacob Duran, professional Kickboxing,  UFC and boxing cutman/Actor appeared in Rocky Balboa & Creed 1,2
 Huck Flener, MLB Pitcher, graduated from Armijo High School
 Augie Galan, MLB All-Star outfielder, lived and died in Fairfield
 Quinton Ganther, NFL free agent, graduated from Fairfield High School class of 2002
 Luis Grijalva, professional runner representing Guatemala, Olympian, graduated from Armijo High School
 Kathleen Hicks, 35th US Deputy Secretary of Defense, born in Fairfield
 Susan Hutchison, Chair of the Washington State Republican Party, former television news journalist
 James-Michael Johnson, NFL linebacker
 Stevie Johnson, starting NFL wide receiver for the San Diego Chargers
 Lee Kohler, musician and leader of the band This World
 Linda Mabalot, filmmaker and activist who founded the Los Angeles Asian Pacific Film Festival
 Pat Morita, Oscar-nominated actor best known as Mr. Miyagi from Karate Kid, longtime Fairfield resident, graduated from Armijo High School
 CC Sabathia, MLB starting pitcher for the New York Yankees and a resident of the Fairfield area
 Alan Sanchez, WBC Continental America's Welterweight Boxing Champion fighting out of Fairfield
 Tony Sanchez (American football), former American College Football coach and player
 Chester See, singer, songwriter, producer, prior host of Disney 365 with over one million subscribers on his YouTube channel as of 2013
 Tracy K. Smith, U.S. Poet Laureate, Pulitzer prize winner
 Anthony Swofford, writer of war movie Jarhead (2005)
 Jason Verrett, NFL cornerback for the San Francisco 49ers
 Dominic Wynn Woods, aka Sage the Gemini, rapper, singer, songwriter, and record producer

Gallery

References

External links

 
 
 Fairfield-Suisun Chamber of Commerce

 
1856 establishments in California
1903 establishments in California
Cities in Solano County, California
County seats in California
Incorporated cities and towns in California
Populated places established in 1856
Populated places established in 1903